The 1971 Australia rugby union tour of France  was a series of eight matches played by the Australia national rugby union team (the "Wallabies") in France in November 1971. The Wallabies drew the series, winning the first test of the two against the France and losing the second. They also played six games against teams described as French Selections (or Regional XVs), of which they won three and lost three.

The matches 
Scores and results list Australia's points tally first.

Squad leadership
The Wallaby squad was captained by Greg Davis  described by Howell as "a leader of men who believed a leader should lead....a single minded flanker who gave no quarter and asked for none". Davis was making his sixth overseas tour with the Wallabies and his second as captain.

Touring party 
Tour Manager: J French
Coach : Bob Templeton
Captain: Greg Davis

Squad

References

\

Australia national rugby union team tours
1971
Toor
tour